The Cathedral Lakes are two lakes located In Yosemite National Park, Mariposa County, California. The lakes are situated 1.6 km (1 mi) southwest of Cathedral Peak and 3.2 km (2 mi) east-northeast of Tenaya Lake; Tresidder Peak is also near. The lower lake is located at elevation , while the upper lake is located at elevation . The John Muir Trail is nearby, with a  round trip hike from the trailhead in Tuolumne Meadows.

See also
List of lakes in California

References

 
 
 

Lakes of Mariposa County, California
Lakes of Yosemite National Park
Tourist attractions in Mariposa County, California